Azua is a province which is collectively one of the thirty-two provinces of the Dominican Republic. It is divided into 10 municipalities (the same as Santiago) and its capital city is Azua de Compostela. It is bordered by the provinces of La Vega to the north-east, San José de Ocoa and Peravia to the east, Barahona and Baoruco to the west and San Juan to the north-west. To the south, Azua has a significant coastline of the Caribbean Sea. Azua is known for its diverse geography and climate, with the southern part of the province having an arid climate that is not the typical tropical-like that is found in other parts of the Caribbean.

Geography
The southern part of the province is located in the Llanura or Llano de Azua (also known as the "Plena de Azua"), a coastal plain surrounded by mountains that act as barriers to the water-laden winds so that the lower parts of the province are very arid.

Azua had the Sierra de Ocoa, which is the southern end of the Cordillera Central, the tallest mountain range in the caribbean. In the northern half of the province is also the Cordillera Central. In the southwest, on the border with the Barahona and Baoruco provinces, are the Martín García and Neiba mountain ranges.

Municipalities and municipal districts

The province as of 20 June 2006 is divided into the following municipalities (municipios) and municipal districts (distrito municipal – D.M.) within them:

Azua (Azua de Compostela)
Barreras (D.M.)
Barro Arriba (D.M.)
Clavellina (D.M.)
Emma Balaguer Viuda Vallejo (D.M.)
Las Barias-La Estancia (D.M.)
Las Lomas (D.M.)
Los Jovillos (D.M.)
Puerto Viejo (D.M.)
Estebanía
Guayabal
Las Charcas
Hatillo (D.M.)
Palmar de Ocoa (D.M.)
Las Yayas de Viajama
Hato Nuevo-Cortés (D.M.)
Villarpando (D.M.)
Padre Las Casas
La Siembra (D.M.)
Las Lagunas (D.M.)
Los Fríos (D.M.)
Peralta
Pueblo Viejo
El Rosario (D.M.)
Sabana Yegua
Ganadero (D.M.)
Proyecto 2-C (D.M.)
Proyecto 4 (D.M.)
Tábara Arriba
Amiama Gómez (D.M.)
Los Toros (D.M.)
Tábara Abajo (D.M.)

Population

The following is a sortable table of the municipalities and municipal districts with population figures as of the 2014 estimate. Urban population are those living in the seats (cabeceras literally heads) of municipalities or of municipal districts. Rural population are those living in the districts (Secciones literally sections) and neighborhoods (Parajes literally places) outside them. The population figures are from the 2014 population estimate.

For comparison with the municipalities and municipal districts of other provinces see the list of municipalities and municipal districts of the Dominican Republic.

See also

 Port of Azua

References

External links
  Oficina Nacional de Estadística, Statistics Portal of the Dominican Republic
  Oficina Nacional de Estadística, Maps with administrative division of the provinces of the Dominican Republic, downloadable in PDF format

 
Azua
States and territories established in 1844